Lockington Marshes is an  biological Site of Special Scientific Interest north of Ratcliffe on Soar in Leicestershire.

This site in the floodplains of the River Soar and River Trent has a periodically flooded meadow, pools and one of the largest areas of willow carr in the county. The invertebrate fauna includes nationally rare beetles and flies, and scarce species such as the water beetle Batenus livens and the weevil anthribus fasciatus.

The site is private land with no public access.

References

Sites of Special Scientific Interest in Leicestershire